Dylan Damraoui (born 4 May 1997) is a Belgian footballer who plays as a midfielder.

Career
Damraoui joined United Soccer League side Portland Timbers 2 on February 22, 2016.

On 31 January 2019, Damraoui joined La Louvière Centre. He left the club in 2021.

References

External links
Timbers 2 Profile

1997 births
Living people
Footballers from Brussels
Belgian footballers
Portland Timbers 2 players
Hapoel Acre F.C. players
UR La Louvière Centre players
Expatriate soccer players in the United States
Expatriate footballers in Israel
Belgian expatriate sportspeople in the United States
Belgian expatriate sportspeople in Israel
Israeli Premier League players
Belgium youth international footballers
Black Belgian sportspeople
Association football midfielders
Belgian expatriate footballers
Belgian sportspeople of Moroccan descent
Belgian people of Republic of the Congo descent
Belgian sportspeople of African descent
USL Championship players